Macroglossum vadenberghi is a moth of the  family Sphingidae. It is known from Indonesia.

It is immediately distinguishable from all other species of Macroglossum species by the white abdominal tuft.

References

Macroglossum
Moths described in 1984